Ferrería/Arena Ciudad de México (formerly Ferrería) is a station along Line 6 of the Mexico City Metro. It is located in the Azcapotzalco municipality, in the north of Mexico City. In 2019, the station had an average ridership of 23,779 passengers per day.

Name and iconography
Before 2012, the station was known only as Ferrería and its icon depicted the head of a cow. This was a reference to a cattle ranch that existed nearby, known as Ferrería; there was also a train station that serviced this ranch.

In 2012, the Arena Ciudad de México was inaugurated, built-in part of the grounds of the former Hacienda Ferrería and within walking distance of the Ferrería station. The name of the station was then changed on 29 November 2012 from Ferrería to Ferrería/Arena Ciudad de México. The pictogram was also modified, with the new icon depicting the stylized façade of the Mexico City Arena.

General information

Metro Ferrería/Arena Ciudad de México runs under Avenida Antigua Calzada de Guadalupe and serves the Colonia Santa Catarina neighbourhood.  The station was opened on 21 December 1983.

The station connects with the Fortuna station, servicing the Ferrocarril Suburbano, through an underground tunnel.

Arena Ciudad de México, an indoor sports and entertainment venue is within walking distance from the station.

Ridership

Gallery

References

External links 

Mexico City Metro Line 6 stations
Railway stations opened in 1983
1983 establishments in Mexico
Mexico City Metro stations in Azcapotzalco